This is the map and list of Asian countries by monthly average wage (annual divided by 12 months) gross and net income (after taxes) average wages for full-time employees in their local currency and in US Dollar. The chart below reflects the average (mean) wage as reported by various data providers. The salary distribution is right-skewed, therefore more than 50% of people earn less than the average gross salary. Thus, the median figures provided further below might be more representative than averages

Maps

Net average monthly salary
The countries and territories have a net average monthly salary of:

Gross average monthly salary
The countries and territories have a gross average monthly salary of:

Net average monthly salary (adjusted for living costs in PPP)
The countries and territories on the map have a net average monthly salary  (adjusted for living costs in PPP) of:

Asian and transcontinental countries by monthly average wage

See also
List of countries by average wage
List of American countries by average wage
List of European countries by average wage

References

 List
Lists of salaries